The Suicide of Rachel Foster is a 2020 adventure video game developed by One-O-One Games and published by Daedalic Entertainment. The story follows Nicole Wilson in Lewis and Clark County, Montana, during December 1993 on a visit to her family's Timberline Hotel. Having left ten years prior with her mother following the revelation that her father Leonard was having an affair with the teenaged Rachel Foster, Nicole plans on quickly inspecting the Timberline and selling it. Forced to stay there due to a heavy snowstorm, her only contact with the outside world is a Federal Emergency Management Agency agent named Irving. With his help, Nicole decides to investigate the affair between Leonard and Rachel, as well as her mysterious suicide.

The Suicide of Rachel Foster took around two years to develop. The studio aimed to create a horror game that emphasized suspense and fear instead of traditional horror monsters. The game's narrative and gameplay were developed simultaneously to ensure that one would complement the other. The game was created as a walking simulator to allow real-life topics to be explored, given the genre's emphasis on narrative. The Overlook Hotel from The Shining (1980) as well as various real-life hotels were used as inspiration for the Timberline's architecture. The developers sought professional advice for the game's depiction of topics such as child sexual abuse and suicide, to portray them with sensitivity.

The game was released in February 2020 for Windows, and in September 2020 for PlayStation 4 and Xbox One. It received mixed reviews from critics. Its setting and sound design were praised for creating the appropriate atmosphere, with Nicole and Irving's relationship and voice actors also being commended; some gameplay aspects were criticized. Conversely, the game's plot and mystery received a more mixed reception, and critics were polarized by the depictions of child sexual abuse and suicide, the depiction of Leonard and Rachel's relationship, and the game's ending. The Suicide of Rachel Foster was nominated for various awards, winning Game of the Year at the 2021 DStars. The game was ported to the Nintendo Switch in October 2021.

Plot
In December 1993, Nicole Wilson reads a letter from her dead mother Claire. Nicole's father, Leonard McGrath, was the owner of the Timberline Hotel, a mountain hotel in Lewis and Clark County, Montana, situated in the Helena National Forest. In 1983, Leonard had an affair with Nicole's 16-year-old classmate Rachel Foster. Once their relationship was discovered, Rachel seemingly killed herself nine weeks into her pregnancy, and Claire left town with Nicole. In the letter, Claire instructs Nicole to inspect the hotel and sell it.

Arriving at the Timberline, Nicole gets a call from Federal Emergency Management Agency (FEMA) agent Irving Crawford, who states he will assist Nicole during her stay. He warns her against leaving due to an ongoing heavy snowstorm, and despite Nicole's attempts to do so, she is unable to leave, angering her. Irving appears aware of the history involving Leonard and Rachel, although Nicole would prefer not to discuss it. As Nicole's lawyer Mr. Jenkins cannot come due to the snowstorm, Irving instructs her to inspect the Timberline's second floor.

After questioning his knowledge about her family and the hotel, Irving reveals that he was often sent by FEMA to provide supplies to the Timberline. A phone rings—even though the hotel's phone lines are down—and Nicole answers. Its voice warns her to not sell the hotel, as Rachel "is still there". The following day, while looking for the hotel's generator, Nicole finds a recently opened lipstick and tells Irving about her theory that Rachel might still be alive, collecting various clues.

Two days later, Irving shows Nicole a tape taken by ghost hunters after Rachel's death. Entering the room where the tape was recorded, she finds it barricaded. After unlocking it, Nicole finds a microphone allowing her to hear faint sounds. In the tape, one of the hunters hears a woman's voice with the microphone and they all flee upon noticing a strange light, with the door shutting behind them.

During Christmas Eve, Nicole wakes up inside a church, which connects to the Timberline through an underground passage. Revisiting the church, she remembers a rhyme Leonard taught her to find a secret storeroom inside the passage. There, she finds a room modeled after Rachel's bedroom and the key to her music box, believing someone—possibly Rachel—was living there. Opening the music box, Nicole remembers the events of December 27, 1983, when Rachel supposedly killed herself; Nicole was playing at a hockey game, which her mother had driven her to.

A day later, Nicole investigates a storeroom filled with mannequins, three of which depict a pregnant woman being killed by someone holding a hockey stick, which Nicole realizes belongs to her. Calling Irving, he acts suspiciously and tells her to continue her search. Going to the second floor, Nicole finds a previously locked door leading to the west wing open. There she finds Irving's room, including the equipment he used to talk to her. Irving reveals he was behind the hotel's strange occurrences and used Nicole to uncover what had happened to Rachel. Irving is Rachel's younger brother and in his restrictive household, only his sister brought him joy. Rachel suffered from dyslexia, with Irving wishing to protect her, while Leonard was the sole person who "saw her".

Going to the attic, Nicole finds a recording Leonard left for her, asking her to find out what happened to Rachel, and the keys to her mother's car. Opening its truck, she finds a blood-stained blanket, and while washing it, uncovers a repressed memory of the night Rachel died. Claire murdered Rachel with Nicole's hockey stick, drove Nicole to her game, and while she was playing, framed Rachel's suicide. Having learned the truth, Irving thanks Rachel and goes out into the cold to die, before the signal is lost, with Nicole begging him to not leave her alone. Later, Nicole is inside her car, planning to take her life via carbon monoxide poisoning. Receiving a call from her lawyer and informing him she will not sell the hotel, she starts the engine and hallucinates talking to her parents. If Nicole turns the engine off, she promises her parents to bring the Timberline back to its feet.

Gameplay

The Suicide of Rachel Foster is a mystery–thriller adventure game played from a first-person perspective. Players take control of Nicole as she explores the Timberline Hotel. Nicole's only means of communication is a radiotelephone she can use to talk to Irving. Players can choose from a dialogue tree how they reply during conversations with him.

Development and release
The Suicide of Rachel Foster was revealed during Gamescom 2018. The game was developed by the Italian studio One-O-One Games using Unreal Engine 4 and published by Daedalic Entertainment. The game was directed by Daniele Azara and its music was composed by Federico Landini. According to art director Graziano Pimpolari, the game took around two years to finish production. The crew and voice actors worked remotely on the game. The Windows version of the game was released on February 19, 2020. The console versions were initially set to release the same year on August 26, but they were postponed and released on September 9. The game was made available on the Nintendo Switch on October 31, 2021.

Setting
Lead programmer Lorenzo Bellincampi stated that the game was not a horror game and described it as being geared toward "nostalgia and mystery rather than fear or terror". The studio intended to create a psychological horror game evoking "unease and fear" without having to resort to traditional monsters or tropes. The horror was intended to be internal, with players being scared by their own expectations and imagination. From the beginning of the game's development, the studio wanted the narrative and gameplay to complement one another, rather than finishing the story first and then choosing an appropriate gameplay style. The game was made a walking simulator due to the genre's high emphasis on narrative, allowing for the exploration of real-life topics. The game has over 100,000 words of dialogue.

According to Graziano Pimpolari, it was fundamental that the game's environment felt real. Montana was chosen both because it allowed the developers to place the Timberline Hotel in an isolated area, and the region's religious and legal background. The hotel was designed to cause fear and feelings of isolation in the player, being set in an enclosed space to increase the claustrophobia. The Timberline Hotel was designed to look authentic for its time. The team implemented architectural and proportional studies to create the hotel, so players could identify with it and be interested in exploring it. The team researched various real-life hotels to create the hotel's floor plan. The hotel's design drew heavily from the Overlook Hotel, featured in Stanley Kubrick's The Shining (1980).

Story and themes
Azara stated the developers were challenged with portraying and discussing topics such as child sexual abuse, grief, and suicide without becoming overly morbid and depressing. To achieve this, they sought advice from partners and professionals. Regarding Rachel and Leonard's ephebophilic relationship, One-O-One stated they were interested in exploring the moral implications of such a situation. Since Rachel and Leonard never properly appear in the story, the developers stated that having their relationship explored through Nicole and how she was affected by the tragedies surrounding it was "central to the horror experience".

Rachel and Leonard's relationship was presented from various perspectives to encourage players to think critically about such a relationship and the repercussions it can have. The team wanted players to reflect on the game's topics after playing it, especially as they believed discussions of these topics can lead to healing. Leonard and Irving seemingly condone his relationship with Rachel, with the developers including this ideology to showcase how people's emotions can blind them and cause them to justify immoral acts.

One-O-One stated that the "controversial decision" to have Nicole potentially die by suicide at the end, and putting her fate in the player's hands, was something they felt was in line with the game's themes and viewed as an "intriguing game mechanic". According to Azara, the game's ending caused many cast members to cry.

Reception

Critical response

According to review aggregator Metacritic, all versions of The Suicide of Rachel Foster received "mixed or average reviews".

The game's setting—the Timberline Hotel—was complimented, as did the sound design for helping create an appropriate atmosphere. Jens Bremicker of ProSieben Games complimented the hotel's design, as did Jerome Joffard of Jeuxvideo.com. Rachel Watts of PC Gamer called the environment "engaging" and capable of creating tension, while Eurogamers Edwin Evans-Thirlwell described the hotel as "creepy" and its design "predatory". Peter Morics of Screen Rant commended the hotel's atmosphere, while praising the game's sound design for keeping the players "on [their] toes". Bremicker praised the sound design for creating an appropriate atmosphere, with Péter Nagy of IGN Hungary also commending it for creating a sense of loneliness.

Despite the Timberline's positive reception, there was criticism of the lack of engagement with the setting and its puzzles. Joffard critiqued the linearity of the game's plot, as it did not allow for a proper exploration of the entire hotel. Alice Bell of Rock Paper Shotgun, while appreciating the hotel's design, denounced its scope and the fact that the puzzle items were rarely required to be used, making them redundant. Bremicker criticized the lack of puzzles in the game, while Evans-Thirlwell found the few existing puzzles overly simplistic.

The game's plot and ending received mixed responses from critics, with many finding the ending inconsistent with the rest of the game. The Washington Posts Christopher Byrd described the game's overall mystery as "obvious" and lacking in scares. Joffard denounced the narrative for not being engaging enough, causing the player to become a spectator. as well as the game's ending and twists, finding them inconsistent with the rest of the game's story. Bell said the game's ending caused the story to "go 'off the rails'", while Nagy found its twists to be ineffective. Though Evans-Thirlwell enjoyed the game's first half, its second half and ending were criticized and described as "melodramatic". Watts stated that while the game initially showed promise—appearing as a ghost story—it eventually became a "melodramatic soap opera". Though Bremicker was critical of the plot for taking too long to truly begin, the ending and its twists were praised. Morics praised the game's plot and described it as "thrilling". While he found the ending "emotionally satisfying", its "logical concerns" were also acknowledged.

The characters Nicole and Irving were commended, as were their relationship and voice acting. Evans-Thirlwell praised both characters, as well as their voice actors' performances, while Bell complimented the voice actors for making the characters interesting. While Nagy found Nicole and Irving to be unoriginal, he applauded their consistent personalities and voice acting, as well as the depiction of their relationship. Watts enjoyed their relationship, likening it to Henry and Delilah from Firewatch (2016), while Morics commended the dialogue between them. Bremicker called Nicole as a strong protagonist, showcased through the game's writing of her conversations with Irving, and the layout of her room. Joffard applauded the voice actors for bringing the characters to life, although they criticized scenes in which Irving calls Nicole without being prompted by the player.

The game's depiction of ephebophilia and suicide, especially the relationship between Leonard and Rachel, was polarizing. Bell criticized the portrayal of Leonard and Rachel's relationship, as did Watts who stated the game portrayal of the relationship in a romantic light, further finding fault with Rachel's lack of agency in the story. Watts criticized the lack of sensitivity afforded to ephebophilia and suicide, finding the game to sensationalize them instead. Similarly, NMEs Vikki Blake did not believe the developers succeeded in causing the game's audience to consider the game's topics, denouncing the portrayal of Leonard and Rachel's relationship since it makes the players sympathize with them. Evans-Thirlwell argued that the portrayal of the game's controversial topics does not create a further understanding of them. While he noted the game does not condemn Leonard's relationship with Rachel, he acknowledged that how the characters reflect on the relationship is not indicative of the developers' opinion.

The game's handling of suicide, especially regarding Nicole's suicide attempt at the end, was also polarizing. Blake disliked the game's ending and the decision to potentially have Nicole commit suicide, arguing that it contrasted her earlier characterization, and criticized it for making players complicit in someone's suicide attempt.

Accolades
The Suicide of Rachel Foster was nominated for the Best Italian Game at the Italian Video Game Awards in 2020, and at the TGM Awards 2020 in the categories Dynamic Adventure and Tell Me a Story. At the 2021 DStars, the game won Game of the Year.

References

External links
 

2020 video games
Adventure games
Fiction about suicide
First-person adventure games
First-person video games
Nintendo Switch games
PlayStation 4 games
Single-player video games
Teenage pregnancy in video games
Unreal Engine games
Video games developed in Italy
Video games set in 1993
Video games set in hotels
Windows games
Xbox One games